Jeewanu (Sanskrit for "particles of life") are synthetic chemical particles that possess cell-like structure and seem to have some functional properties; that is, they are a model of primitive cells, or protocells. It was first synthesised by Krishna Bahadur (20 January 1926 — 5 August 1994), an Indian chemist and his team in 1963. Using photochemical reaction, they produced coacervates, microscopic cell-like spheres from a mixture of simple organic and inorganic compounds. Bahadur named these particles 'Jeewanu' because they exhibit some of the basic properties of a cell, such as the presence of semipermeable membrane, amino acids, phospholipids and carbohydrates. Further, like living cells, they had several catalytic activities. Jeewanu are cited as models of protocells  for the origin of life, and as artificial cells.

Etymology

Jeewanu is derived from Sanskrit jeewa, meaning "life", and anu, meaning the "smallest part of something", or the "indivisible". In contemporary Hindi, jeewanu also means unicellular organisms such as bacteria. Bahadur specifically used the term to represent the Indian philosophical tradition not only through the use of Sanskrit but also by inferring ideas on the origin of life from the Vedas. Bahadur, while employing the traditional Hindu philosophy, attempted to incorporate the advances in cell biology to the concept of abiogenesis.

Synthesis

In 1954 and 1958 Krishna Bahadur and co-workers published the successful synthesis of amino acids from a mixture of paraformaldehyde, colloidal molybdenum oxide or potassium nitrate and ferric chloride under sunlight. It appears that this experimental approach was seminal for the assays to produce Jeewanu, which he first reported in 1963 in an obscure Indian journal, Vijnana Parishad Anusandhan Patrika. His detailed syntheses were published in Germany in 1964 in a series of articles.

Their initial experiment consisted of a sterilised apparatus in which inorganic nitrogenous compounds (such as ammonium phosphate and ammonium molybdate) and organic compounds such as citric acid (C6H8O7), paraformaldehyde (OH(CH2O)nH) and formaldehyde (CH2O) for carbon sources were mixed with minerals commonly found in living cells. Inorganic substances such as colloidal ferric chloride or molybdenum compounds supposedly acted as cofactors and catalysts.

When the apparatus was exposed to sunlight for several days and constantly shaken, microscopic spherical particles were formed. The interesting features of these particles were that they were enclosed in a semipermeable membrane, like the typical cell membrane. Like living cells, they were reported to contain amino acids, phospholipid membrane and carbohydrates. In addition, they were claimed to have reproductive capability by budding, much like unicellular organisms, but did not grow on any bacterial culture medium.  Bahadur reported that the Jeewanu exhibited various catalytic properties and produced their own peptides by metabolic reactions. Bahadur's later work on the Jeewanu also detected the presence of amino acids in peptide form and sugars in the form of ribose, deoxyribose, fructose and glucose, as well as nucleic acid bases (DNA and RNA building blocks) including adenine, guanine, cytosine, thymine and uracil. Bahadur also reported having detected ATPase-like and peroxidase-like activity. Bahadur stated that by using molybdenum as a cofactor, the Jeewanu showed capability of reversible photochemical electron transfer, and released a gas mixture of oxygen and hydrogen at a 1:2 ratio.

Scientific reviews

Bahadur's publications were ambivalently received, and the overall attention of the scientific community seemed limited since Krishna Bahadur and his co-workers reported that the Jeewanus are alive (a striking statement), the team changed the protocols frequently and documented them somewhat idiosyncratically. Bahadur defined "living units" as "[...] those which grow, multiply, and are metabolically active in a systematic, harmonious, and synchronized manner". Then, NASA's Exobiology Division tasked two biologists in 1967 to review and evaluate the literature so far published by Krishna Bahadur (not to replicate the experiments) on the synthesis and characteristics of the Jeewanu. The two NASA biologists did not debate whether these three criteria are an adequate definition of life, but whether the Jeewanu satisfy these criteria. The NASA report concluded that "the evidence presented on these three points is on the whole unconvincing". The report also stated that the postulated existence of these living units has not been proved and "the nature and properties of the Jeewanu remains to be clarified."

In the 1980s, the Hungarian chemist Tibor Gánti discussed the Jeewanu at length in his 'chemoton theory'—an abstract model of autocatalytic chemical reactions—published first in Hungarian and translated into English in 2003. In the context of self-organizing structures, Gánti considered the Jeewanu a promising model system to understand the origin and fundamentals of life, and one that had never received due attention. In 2011, a German scientist stated that the Jeewanu story pertains to concepts of life, its beginnings, as well as possible artificially created cells.

Experimental duplication work published in 2013 by Gupta and Rai reported that their size varies from 0.5 μ to 3.5 μ in diameter, growth from within, metabolic activities, and "the presence of RNA-like material". The authors stated that the RNA-like material detected in the Jeewanu protocells support the RNA world hypothesis.

See also 

 Abiogenesis
 Artificial cell
 Emergence
 Endocytosis
 Endosymbiotic theory
 Entropy and life
 Evolutionary developmental biology
 Last universal ancestor
 Lipid bilayer characterization
 Lipid bilayer phase behavior
 Model lipid bilayer
 Protocell Circus – a film
 Pseudo-panspermia

References

Books
"Synthesis of Jeewanu, the Protocell." Bahadur, Krishna. (In English) Ram Narain Lal Beni Prasad, New Katra, Allahabad-211002 (U.P) India. ASIN: B0007JHWU0 (1966)
"Origin of Life: A Functional Approach." Bahadur K. and Ranganayaki S.Ram Narain Lal Beni Prasad, New Katra, Allahabad-211002(U.P), India, (1981)

External links 
jeewanu.com Dr. Krishna Bahadur's homepage.

Evolutionary biology
Membrane biology
Origin of life
Synthetic biology
Prebiotic chemistry